MyRIO is a real-time embedded evaluation board made by National Instruments.  It is used to develop
applications that utilize its onboard FPGA and microprocessor.  It requires LabVIEW.  It's geared towards students and basic applications.

Specifications
(for myRIO-1900)
  Xilinx Z-7010 processor 667 MHz (ARM Cortex A9 x2 cores 28 nm process NEON SIMD, VFPv3 Vector Float)
  Memory: NV: 256 MB, DDR3 512MB, 533 MHz, 16 bits
  FPGA type same as processor
  Wireless: IEEE 802.11 b,g,n  ISM 2.4 GHz 20 MHz.
  USB 2.0 Hi-Speed
  Breakout Board support
  2 ports of 16 Digital I/O lines
  3 axis accelerometer
  Max power consumption : 14 W
  Typical idle : 2.6 W
  LED's

Similar products

cRIO (compactRIO)
myDAQ

References

Programmable logic controllers
Real-time computing